The Qara Qoyunlu or Kara Koyunlu, also known as the Black Sheep Turkomans, were a culturally Persianate, Muslim Turkoman monarchy that ruled over the territory comprising present-day Azerbaijan, Georgia, Armenia, northwestern Iran, eastern Turkey, and northeastern Iraq from about 1374 to 1468.

History

Etymology 
The name Qara Qoyunlu literally means "[those with] black sheep". It has been suggested that this name refers to old totemic symbols, but according to Rashid al-Din Hamadani, the Turks were forbidden to eat the flesh of their totem-animals, and so this is unlikely given the importance of mutton in the diet of pastoral nomads. Another hypothesis is that the name refers to the predominant color of their flocks.

Origins
The ruling family descended from the Yıwa tribe of the Oghuz Turks, specifically, the Baharlu, who by the fourteenth century possessed territories north of Lake Van and Mosul in Upper Mesopotamia. The tribes that comprised the Qara Qoyunlu besides Baharlu were Saadlu, Karamanlu, Alpaut, Dukharlu, Jagirlu, Hajilu, Agacheri. According to Faruk Sümer, the Qara Qoyunlu tribe was undoubtedly a sub-tribe (oba) of the Oghuz, and Minorsky's claim that this sub-tribe belonged to the Yiwa is probably true.

Duharlu Turkmens, a branch of Qara Qoyunlu first appeared in the Chronicle of Michael Panaretos. It is probable that the Duharlu tribe came to Anatolia from Central Asia during the Mongol invasions, as testified by the legendary tradition of Qara Qoyunlu.

Rise

The Qara Qoyunlu Turkomans were initially vassals of the Jalayirid Sultanate in Baghdad and Tabriz from about 1375, when the leader of their leading tribe ruled Mosul. However, they rebelled against the Jalayirids and secured their independence from the dynasty with the conquest of Tabriz by Qara Yusuf.

In 1400, the Timurid Empire under Timur defeated the Qara Qoyunlu, and Qara Yusuf fled to Egypt, seeking refuge with the Mamluk Sultanate. Qara Yusuf was welcomed by Sheikh Mahmud, the nāʾib of Damascus. Not long after, the Jalayirid sultan Ahmad Jalayir also came to Damascus. Not wanting to worsen relations with Timur, An-Nasir Faraj agreed to capture Qara Yusuf and Ahmad Jalayir and hand them over to him. Together in prison, the two leaders renewed their friendship, making an agreement that Ahmad Jalayir should keep Baghdad while Qara Yusuf would have Azerbaijan. Ahmad also adopted Qara Yusuf's son Pirbudag. When Timur died in 1405, an-Nasir Faraj released them both. However, according to Faruk Sümer, they were released on the orders of rebellious wali of Damascus, Sheykh Mahmud.

Qara Yusuf, having returned from exile, forced Timur's governor of Van, Izzaddin Shir, to submit, while capturing Altamış, another viceroy set up by Timur, and sending him to Barquq. He later moved on to the territories of Azerbaijan. He defeated the Timurid Abu Bakr at the Battle of Nakhchivan on 14 October 1406 and reoccupied Tabriz. Abu Bakr and his father Miran Shah tried to recapture Azerbaijan, but on 20 April 1408, Qara Yusuf inflicted a decisive defeat on them at the Battle of Sardrud in which Miran Shah was killed. In 1409 fall, Qara Yusuf entered Tabriz and sent a raiding party to Shirvan, especially Shaki, which was fruitless.

In 1410, the Qara Qoyunlu captured Baghdad. The installation of a subsidiary Qara Qoyunlu line there hastened the downfall of the Jalairids they had once served. Despite internal fighting among Qara Yusuf's descendants after his death in 1420, The Qara Qoyunlu state collapsed after Qara Yusif. After the death of Qara Yusuf in December 1420, Shah Rukh tried to take Azerbaijan from Qara Yusuf's son Iskander, using the fact that none of his sons was accompanying his father. Despite defeating Iskander, twice in 1420–21 and 1429, only in the third expedition of Shahrukh Mirza in 1434–35 did the Timurids succeed, when he entrusted the government to Iskander's own brother, Jahan Shah (1436-1467) as his vassal. In 1436 he obtained the help of Shah Rukh to defeat Iskander and seize the throne for himself. He was also adopted by Gawhar Shad and crowned on 19 April 1438, taking the epithet Muzaffar al-Din. 

Due to the mistakes of his predecessor, the Timurid Shah Rukh, was the first to convene a party in the palace. They brought the Timurids to the capital. But he went to war with his enemies, the Aq Qoyunlular. Jahanshah Haqiqi died in the battle of Mus. Qara Qoyunlu was almost destroyed. This time Hasanali Mirza came to power, but was killed by Uzun Hasan and the Qara Qoyunlu state collapsed.

Decline

In 1410, Armenia fell under the control of the Qara Qoyunlu. The principal Armenian sources available in this period come from the historian Tovma Metsopetsi and several colophons to contemporary manuscripts. According to Tovma, although the Qara Qoyunlu levied heavy taxes against the Armenians, the early years of their rule were relatively peaceful and some reconstruction of towns took place. This peaceful period was, however, shattered with the rise of Qara Iskander, who reportedly made Armenia a "desert" and subjected it to "devastation and plunder, to slaughter, and captivity". Iskander's wars with and eventual defeat by the Timurids invited further destruction in Armenia, as many Armenians were taken captive and sold into slavery and the land was subjected to outright pillaging, forcing many of them to leave the region. Iskander did attempt to reconcile with the Armenians by appointing an Armenian from a noble family, Rustum, as one of his advisers.

When the Timurids launched their final incursion into the region, they convinced Jihanshah, Iskander's brother, to turn on his brother. Jihanshah pursued a policy of persecution against the Armenians in Syunik and colophons to Armenian manuscripts record the sacking of the Tatev monastery by his forces. But he, too, sought a rapprochement with the Armenians, allotting land to feudal lords, rebuilding churches, and approving the relocation of the seat of the Armenian Apostolic Church's Catholicos to Etchmiadzin Cathedral in 1441. For all this, Jihanshah continued to attack Armenian towns and take Armenian captives as the country saw further devastation in the final years of Jihanshah's failed struggles with the Aq Qoyunlu.

Jahan Shah made peace with the Timurid Shahrukh Mirza; however, this soon fell apart. When Shahrukh Mirza died in 1447, the Qara Qoyunlu Turkomans annexed portions of Iraq and the eastern coast of the Arabian Peninsula as well as Timurid-controlled western Iran. Though much territory was gained during his rule, Jahān Shāh's reign was troubled by his rebellious sons and the almost autonomous rulers of Baghdad, whom he expelled in 1464. In 1466, Jahan Shah attempted to take Diyarbakır from the Aq Qoyunlu ("White Sheep Turkomans"), however, this was a catastrophic failure resulting in Jahān Shāh's death and the collapse of the Qara Qoyunlu Turkomans' control in the Middle East. By 1468, at their height under Uzun Hasan (1452–1478), Aq Qoyunlu defeated the Qara Qoyunlu and conquered Iraq, Azerbaijan, and western Iran.

Religion

Governance 

The Qara Qoyunlu state organization was based mainly on of its predecessors, Jalayirids, and the Ilkhanids. Qara Qoyunlu rulers used the title sultan since the enthronement of Pirbudag by Qara Yusuf. Sometimes the title bahadur appeared on the coinage. They also used the titles khan, khagan and padishah.

Keeping with a Persianate culture, the Qara Qoyunlu used the Persian language for diplomacy, poetry, and as a court language. Diplomatic letters to the Timurids and Ottomans were written in Persian, while the correspondence with the Mamluk sultans were in Arabic. Official internal documents (farmān, suyūrghāl) were also written in Persian.

As for the provincial organization, the provinces were governed by şehzade and beys, who had smaller divans in each of the provinces. The governance by military governors (beys) generally passed on from father to son. In the cities there were officials called darugha, that looked after financial and administrative affairs, and also had political powers. The şehzades and beys had their own soldiers which were called nökers, who were trained and salaried.

Culture
Under Timur, the cultural entity of Iran was renewed by Persian literature, art and culture being patronized throughout the Timurid Empire. Consequently, Qara Qoyunlu art was notably influenced by the Timurids. Jahan Shah wrote his poetry in Azerbaijani and Persian, while the Kitab-i Diyarbakriyya, a history of the Qara Qoyunlu and Aq Qoyunlu, was written by Abu Bakr Tehrani in Persian.

See also

List of rulers of Qara Qoyunlu
 Turkmen incursions into Georgia
 Mausoleum of Turkmen emirs
 Qutb Shahis

Notes

References

Works cited

 

 

{{cite book |first=Kaushik |last=Roy |title=Military Transition in Early Modern Asia, 1400-1750 |publisher=Bloomsbury |year=2014 |quote=Post-Mongol Persia and Iraq were ruled by two tribal confederations: Akkoyunlu (White Sheep) (1378–1507) and Qaraoyunlu (Black Sheep). They were Persianate Turkoman Confederations of Anatolia (Asia Minor) and Azerbaijan.}}

Further reading
 Bosworth, Clifford. The New Islamic Dynasties, 1996.
  Khachikyan, Levon. ԺԵ դարի հայերեն ձեռագրերի հիշատակարաններ, մաս 1 (Fifteenth Century Armenian Colophons, Part 1). Yerevan, 1955.
 Morby, John. The Oxford Dynasties of the World, 2002.
 Sanjian, Avedis K. Colophons of Armenian manuscripts, 1301-1480: A Source for Middle Eastern History, Selected, Translated, and Annotated by Avedis K. Sanjian. Cambridge: Harvard University Press, 1969.
 Shukurov, Rustam. The Byzantine Turks 1204-1461''. Brill, 2016.

 
Empires and kingdoms of Iran
Former countries in Western Asia
Former countries in the Middle East
Medieval history of Iran
Medieval Iraq
Medieval Azerbaijan
Medieval Iranian Azerbaijan
15th century in Armenia
Medieval Islamic world
14th century in Asia
15th century in Asia
States and territories established in 1375
States and territories disestablished in 1468
1375 establishments in Asia
1468 disestablishments in Asia
Former monarchies of Western Asia
1370s in the Middle East